The 98th United States Congress was a meeting of the legislative branch of the United States federal government, composed of the United States Senate and the United States House of Representatives. It met in Washington, D.C. from January 3, 1983, to January 3, 1985, during the third and fourth years of Ronald Reagan's presidency. The apportionment of seats in the House of Representatives was based on the 1980 U.S. census.

The Republicans maintained control of the Senate, while the Democrats increased their majority in the House of Representatives from the 97th Congress.

Major events

February 24, 1983: A special commission of the Congress released a report critical of the practice of Japanese internment during World War II.
March 23, 1983: President Ronald Reagan made his Strategic Defense Initiative proposal.
April 18, 1983: U.S. Embassy bombed in Beirut, killing 63 people.
October 23, 1983: Simultaneous suicide truck-bombings destroyed both the French and the United States Marine Corps barracks in Beirut, killing 241 U.S. servicemen, 58 French paratroopers and 6 Lebanese civilians.
October 25, 1983: United States troops invaded Grenada
November 6, 1984:
1984 United States presidential election: Re-election of Ronald Reagan
1984 United States Senate elections: Republicans retained Senate, but lost 2 seats
1984 United States House of Representatives elections: Democrats retained House, but lost 16 seats

Major legislation

 April 20, 1983: Social Security Amendments of 1983, 
 November 2, 1983: Martin Luther King Jr. Day law, 
 July 17, 1984: Land Remote-Sensing Commercialization Act of 1984, 
 July 17, 1984: National Minimum Drinking Age Act, 
 September 28, 1984: Voting Accessibility for the Elderly and Handicapped Act, 
 October 12, 1984: Comprehensive Crime Control Act, title II
 October 19, 1984: National Archives and Records Administration Act, 
 October 19, 1984: Aviation Drug-Trafficking Control Act of 1984, 
 October 30, 1984: Commercial Space Launch Act of 1984,

Party summary

Senate

House of Representatives

Leadership

Senate
 President: George H. W. Bush (R)
 President pro tempore: Strom Thurmond (R)

Majority (Republican) leadership

 Majority Leader: Howard Baker
 Majority Whip: Ted Stevens
 Republican Conference Chairman: James A. McClure
 Republican Conference Secretary: Jake Garn
 National Senatorial Committee Chair: Richard Lugar
 Policy Committee Chairman: John Tower

Minority (Democratic) leadership

 Minority Leader and Democratic Conference Chairman: Robert Byrd
 Minority Whip: Alan Cranston
 Democratic Caucus Secretary: Daniel Inouye
 Democratic Campaign Committee Chairman: Lloyd Bentsen

House of Representatives
 Speaker: Tip O'Neill (D)

Majority (Democratic) leadership

 Majority Leader: Jim Wright
 Majority Whip: Tom Foley
 Chief Deputy Majority Whip: William Vollie Alexander Jr.
 Democratic Caucus Chairman: Gillis William Long
 Democratic Caucus Secretary: Geraldine Ferraro
 Democratic Campaign Committee Chairman: Tony Coelho

Minority (Republican) leadership

 Minority Leader: Robert H. Michel
 Minority Whip: Trent Lott
 Chief Deputy Whip: Tom Loeffler
 Republican Conference Chairman: Jack Kemp
 Republican Conference Vice-Chairman: Jack Edwards
 Republican Conference Secretary: Clair Burgener
 Policy Committee Chairman: Dick Cheney
 Republican Campaign Committee Chairman: Guy Vander Jagt

Caucuses
 Congressional Arts Caucus
 Congressional Black Caucus
 Congressional Hispanic Caucus
 Congressional Friends of Ireland Caucus
 Congressional Pediatric & Adult Hydrocephalus Caucus
 Congressional Travel & Tourism Caucus
 Congresswomen's Caucus
 House Democratic Caucus
 Senate Democratic Caucus

Members
This list is arranged by chamber, then by state. Senators are listed by class and representatives are listed by district.

Senate
Senators are elected statewide every two years, with approximately one-third beginning new six-year terms with each Congress, In this Congress, Class 2 meant their term ended with this Congress, facing re-election in 1984; Class 3 meant their term began in the last Congress, facing re-election in 1986; and Class 1 meant their term began in this Congress, facing re-election in 1988.

Alabama 
 2. Howell Heflin (D)
 3. Jeremiah Denton (R)

Alaska 
 2. Ted Stevens (R)
 3. Frank Murkowski (R)

Arizona 
 1. Dennis DeConcini (D)
 3. Barry Goldwater (R)

Arkansas 
 2. David Pryor (D)
 3. Dale Bumpers (D)

California 
 1. Pete Wilson (R)
 3. Alan Cranston (D)

Colorado 
 2. William L. Armstrong (R)
 3. Gary Hart (D)

Connecticut 
 1. Lowell Weicker (R)
 3. Chris Dodd (D)

Delaware 
 1. William Roth (R)
 2. Joe Biden (D)

Florida 
 1. Lawton Chiles (D)
 3. Paula Hawkins (R)

Georgia 
 2. Sam Nunn (D)
 3. Mack Mattingly (R)

Hawaii 
 1. Spark Matsunaga (D)
 3. Daniel Inouye (D)

Idaho 
 2. James A. McClure (R)
 3. Steve Symms (R)

Illinois 
 2. Charles H. Percy (R)
 3. Alan J. Dixon (D)

Indiana 
 1. Richard Lugar (R)
 3. Dan Quayle (R)

Iowa 
 2. Roger Jepsen (R)
 3. Chuck Grassley (R)

Kansas 
 2. Nancy Kassebaum (R)
 3. Bob Dole (R)

Kentucky 
 2. Walter "Dee" Huddleston (D)
 3. Wendell Ford (D)

Louisiana 
 2. J. Bennett Johnston (D)
 3. Russell B. Long (D)

Maine 
 1. George J. Mitchell (D)
 2. William Cohen (R)

Maryland 
 1. Paul Sarbanes (D)
 3. Charles Mathias (R)

Massachusetts 
 1. Ted Kennedy (D)
 2. Paul Tsongas (D), until January 2, 1985
 John Kerry (D), from January 2, 1985

Michigan 
 1. Donald Riegle (D)
 2. Carl Levin (D)

Minnesota 
 1. David Durenberger (R)
 2. Rudy Boschwitz (R)

Mississippi 
 1. John C. Stennis (D)
 2. Thad Cochran (R)

Missouri 
 1. John Danforth (R)
 3. Thomas Eagleton (D)

Montana 
 1. John Melcher (D)
 2. Max Baucus (D)

Nebraska 
 1. Edward Zorinsky (D)
 2. J. James Exon (D)

Nevada 
 1. Chic Hecht (R)
 3. Paul Laxalt (R)

New Hampshire 
 2. Gordon J. Humphrey (R)
 3. Warren Rudman (R)

New Jersey 
 1. Frank Lautenberg (D)
 2. Bill Bradley (D)

New Mexico 
 1. Jeff Bingaman (D)
 2. Pete Domenici (R)

New York 
 1. Daniel Patrick Moynihan (D)
 3. Al D'Amato (R)

North Carolina 
 2. Jesse Helms (R)
 3. John Porter East (R)

North Dakota 
 1. Quentin Burdick (D-NPL)
 3. Mark Andrews (R)

Ohio 
 1. Howard Metzenbaum (D)
 3. John Glenn (D)

Oklahoma 
 2. David Boren (D)
 3. Don Nickles (R)

Oregon 
 2. Mark Hatfield (R)
 3. Bob Packwood (R)

Pennsylvania 
 1. John Heinz (R)
 3. Arlen Specter (R)

Rhode Island 
 1. John Chafee (R)
 2. Claiborne Pell (D)

South Carolina 
 2. Strom Thurmond (R)
 3. Fritz Hollings (D)

South Dakota 
 2. Larry Pressler (R)
 3. James Abdnor (R)

Tennessee 
 1. Jim Sasser (D)
 2. Howard Baker (R)

Texas 
 1. Lloyd Bentsen (D)
 2. John Tower (R)

Utah 
 1. Orrin Hatch (R)
 3. Jake Garn (R)

Vermont 
 1. Robert Stafford (R)
 3. Patrick Leahy (D)

Virginia 
 1. Paul Trible (R)
 2. John Warner (R)

Washington 
 1. Henry M. Jackson (D), until September 1, 1983
 Daniel J. Evans (R), from September 12, 1983
 3. Slade Gorton (R)

West Virginia 
 1. Robert Byrd (D)
 2. Jennings Randolph (D)

Wisconsin 
 1. William Proxmire (D)
 3. Bob Kasten (R)

Wyoming 
 1. Malcolm Wallop (R)
 2. Alan Simpson (R)

House of Representatives

Alabama 
 . Jack Edwards (R)
 . William Louis Dickinson (R)
 . Bill Nichols (D)
 . Tom Bevill (D)
 . Ronnie Flippo (D)
 . Ben Erdreich (D)
 . Richard Shelby (D)

Alaska 
 . Don Young (R)

Arizona 
 . John McCain (R)
 . Mo Udall (D)
 . Bob Stump (R)
 . Eldon Rudd (R)
 . James F. McNulty Jr. (D)

Arkansas 
 . William Vollie Alexander Jr. (D)
 . Ed Bethune (R)
 . John Paul Hammerschmidt (R)
 . Beryl Anthony Jr. (D)

California 
 . Douglas H. Bosco (D)
 . Eugene A. Chappie (R)
 . Bob Matsui (D)
 . Vic Fazio (D)
 . Phillip Burton (D), until April 10, 1983
 Sala Burton (D), from June 21, 1983
 . Barbara Boxer (D)
 . George Miller (D)
 . Ron Dellums (D)
 . Pete Stark (D)
 . Don Edwards (D)
 . Tom Lantos (D)
 . Ed Zschau (R)
 . Norman Mineta (D)
 . Norman D. Shumway (R)
 . Tony Coelho (D)
 . Leon Panetta (D)
 . Chip Pashayan (R)
 . Richard H. Lehman (D)
 . Robert J. Lagomarsino (R)
 . Bill Thomas (R)
 . Bobbi Fiedler (R)
 . Carlos Moorhead (R)
 . Anthony Beilenson (D)
 . Henry Waxman (D)
 . Edward R. Roybal (D)
 . Howard Berman (D)
 . Mel Levine (D)
 . Julian Dixon (D)
 . Augustus Hawkins (D)
 . Matthew G. Martínez (D)
 . Mervyn Dymally (D)
 . Glenn M. Anderson (D)
 . David Dreier (R)
 . Esteban Edward Torres (D)
 . Jerry Lewis (R)
 . George Brown Jr. (D)
 . Al McCandless (R)
 . Jerry M. Patterson (D)
 . William E. Dannemeyer (R)
 . Robert Badham (R)
 . Bill Lowery (R)
 . Dan Lungren (R)
 . Ron Packard (R)
 . Jim Bates (D)
 . Duncan L. Hunter (R)

Colorado 
 . Pat Schroeder (D)
 . Tim Wirth (D)
 . Ray Kogovsek (D)
 . Hank Brown (R)
 . Ken Kramer (R)
 . Dan Schaefer (R), from March 29, 1983

Connecticut 
 . Barbara B. Kennelly (D)
 . Sam Gejdenson (D)
 . Bruce Morrison (D)
 . Stewart McKinney (R)
 . William R. Ratchford (D)
 . Nancy Johnson (R)

Delaware 
 . Tom Carper (D)

Florida 
 . Earl Hutto (D)
 . Don Fuqua (D)
 . Charles E. Bennett (D)
 . Bill Chappell (D)
 . Bill McCollum (R)
 . Buddy MacKay (D)
 . Sam Gibbons (D)
 . Bill Young (R)
 . Michael Bilirakis (R)
 . Andy Ireland (D, then R)
 . Bill Nelson (D)
 . Tom Lewis (R)
 . Connie Mack III (R)
 . Dan Mica (D)
 . Clay Shaw (R)
 . Lawrence J. Smith (D)
 . William Lehman (D)
 . Claude Pepper (D)
 . Dante Fascell (D)

Georgia 
 . Lindsay Thomas (D)
 . Charles Floyd Hatcher (D)
 . Richard Ray (D)
 . Elliott H. Levitas (D)
 . Wyche Fowler (D)
 . Newt Gingrich (R)
 . Larry McDonald (D), until September 1, 1983
 George Darden (D), from November 8, 1983
 . J. Roy Rowland (D)
 . Ed Jenkins (D)
 . Doug Barnard Jr. (D)

Hawaii 
 . Cecil Heftel (D)
 . Daniel Akaka (D)

Idaho 
 . Larry Craig (R)
 . George V. Hansen (R)

Illinois 
 . Harold Washington (D), until April 30, 1983
 Charles Hayes (D), from August 23, 1983
 . Gus Savage (D)
 . Marty Russo (D)
 . George M. O'Brien (R)
 . Bill Lipinski (D)
 . Henry Hyde (R)
 . Cardiss Collins (D)
 . Dan Rostenkowski (D)
 . Sidney R. Yates (D)
 . John Porter (R)
 . Frank Annunzio (D)
 . Phil Crane (R)
 . John N. Erlenborn (R)
 . Tom Corcoran (R), until November 28, 1984
 . Edward Rell Madigan (R)
 . Lynn Morley Martin (R)
 . Lane Evans (D)
 . Robert H. Michel (R)
 . Dan Crane (R)
 . Dick Durbin (D)
 . Melvin Price (D)
 . Paul Simon (D)

Indiana 
 . Katie Hall (D)
 . Philip Sharp (D)
 . John P. Hiler (R)
 . Dan Coats (R)
 . Elwood Hillis (R)
 . Dan Burton (R)
 . John T. Myers (R)
 . Frank McCloskey (D)
 . Lee Hamilton (D)
 . Andrew Jacobs Jr. (D)

Iowa 
 . Jim Leach (R)
 . Tom Tauke (R)
 . T. Cooper Evans (R)
 . Neal Edward Smith (D)
 . Tom Harkin (D)
 . Berkley Bedell (D)

Kansas 
 . Pat Roberts (R)
 . Jim Slattery (D)
 . Larry Winn (R)
 . Dan Glickman (D)
 . Bob Whittaker (R)

Kentucky 
 . Carroll Hubbard (D)
 . William Natcher (D)
 . Romano Mazzoli (D)
 . Gene Snyder (R)
 . Hal Rogers (R)
 . Larry J. Hopkins (R)
 . Carl D. Perkins (D), until August 3, 1984
 Chris Perkins (D), from November 6, 1984

Louisiana 
 . Bob Livingston (R)
 . Lindy Boggs (D)
 . Billy Tauzin (D)
 . Buddy Roemer (D)
 . Jerry Huckaby (D)
 . Henson Moore (R)
 . John Breaux (D)
 . Gillis William Long (D)

Maine 
 . John R. McKernan Jr. (R)
 . Olympia Snowe (R)

Maryland 
 . Roy Dyson (D)
 . Clarence Long (D)
 . Barbara Mikulski (D)
 . Marjorie Holt (R)
 . Steny Hoyer (D)
 . Beverly Byron (D)
 . Parren Mitchell (D)
 . Michael D. Barnes (D)

Massachusetts 
 . Silvio O. Conte (R)
 . Edward Boland (D)
 . Joseph D. Early (D)
 . Barney Frank (D)
 . James Shannon (D)
 . Nicholas Mavroules (D)
 . Ed Markey (D)
 . Tip O'Neill (D)
 . Joe Moakley (D)
 . Gerry Studds (D)
 . Brian J. Donnelly (D)

Michigan 
 . John Conyers (D)
 . Carl Pursell (R)
 . Howard Wolpe (D)
 . Mark D. Siljander (R)
 . Harold S. Sawyer (R)
 . Milton Robert Carr (D)
 . Dale Kildee (D)
 . J. Bob Traxler (D)
 . Guy Vander Jagt (R)
 . Donald J. Albosta (D)
 . Robert William Davis (R)
 . David Bonior (D)
 . George Crockett Jr. (D)
 . Dennis Hertel (D)
 . William D. Ford (D)
 . John Dingell (D)
 . Sander Levin (D)
 . William Broomfield (R)

Minnesota 
 . Tim Penny (DFL)
 . Vin Weber (R)
 . Bill Frenzel (R)
 . Bruce Vento (DFL)
 . Martin Olav Sabo (DFL)
 . Gerry Sikorski (DFL)
 . Arlan Stangeland (R)
 . Jim Oberstar (DFL)

Mississippi 
 . Jamie Whitten (D)
 . Webb Franklin (R)
 . Sonny Montgomery (D)
 . Wayne Dowdy (D)
 . Trent Lott (R)

Missouri 
 . Bill Clay (D)
 . Robert A. Young (D)
 . Dick Gephardt (D)
 . Ike Skelton (D)
 . Alan Wheat (D)
 . Tom Coleman (R)
 . Gene Taylor (R)
 . Bill Emerson (R)
 . Harold Volkmer (D)

Montana 
 . Pat Williams (D)
 . Ron Marlenee (R)

Nebraska 
 . Doug Bereuter (R)
 . Hal Daub (R)
 . Virginia D. Smith (R)

Nevada 
 . Harry Reid (D)
 . Barbara Vucanovich (R)

New Hampshire 
 . Norman D'Amours (D)
 . Judd Gregg (R)

New Jersey 
 . James Florio (D)
 . William J. Hughes (D)
 . James J. Howard (D)
 . Chris Smith (R)
 . Marge Roukema (R)
 . Bernard J. Dwyer (D)
 . Matthew John Rinaldo (R)
 . Robert A. Roe (D)
 . Robert Torricelli (D)
 . Peter W. Rodino (D)
 . Joseph Minish (D)
 . Jim Courter (R)
 . Edwin B. Forsythe (R), until March 29, 1984
 Jim Saxton (R), from November 6, 1984
 . Frank Joseph Guarini (D)

New Mexico 
 . Manuel Lujan Jr. (R)
 . Joe Skeen (R)
 . Bill Richardson (D)

New York 
 . William Carney (C)
 . Thomas Downey (D)
 . Robert J. Mrazek (D)
 . Norman F. Lent (R)
 . Raymond J. McGrath (R)
 . Joseph P. Addabbo (D)
 . Benjamin Stanley Rosenthal (D), until January 4, 1983
 Gary Ackerman (D), from March 1, 1983
 . James H. Scheuer (D)
 . Geraldine Ferraro (D)
 . Chuck Schumer (D)
 . Edolphus Towns (D)
 . Major Owens (D)
 . Stephen Solarz (D)
 . Guy Molinari (R)
 . Bill Green (R)
 . Charles Rangel (D)
 . Ted Weiss (D)
 . Robert Garcia (D)
 . Mario Biaggi (D)
 . Richard Ottinger (D)
 . Hamilton Fish IV (R)
 . Benjamin Gilman (R)
 . Samuel S. Stratton (D)
 . Gerald Solomon (R)
 . Sherwood Boehlert (R)
 . David O'Brien Martin (R)
 . George C. Wortley (R)
 . Matthew F. McHugh (D)
 . Frank Horton (R)
 . Barber Conable (R)
 . Jack Kemp (R)
 . John LaFalce (D)
 . Henry J. Nowak (D)
 . Stan Lundine (D)

North Carolina 
 . Walter B. Jones Sr. (D)
 . Tim Valentine (D)
 . Charles Orville Whitley (D)
 . Ike Franklin Andrews (D)
 . Stephen L. Neal (D)
 . Charles Robin Britt (D)
 . Charlie Rose (D)
 . Bill Hefner (D)
 . James G. Martin (R)
 . Jim Broyhill (R)
 . James M. Clarke (D)

North Dakota 
 . Byron Dorgan (D-NPL)

Ohio 
 . Tom Luken (D)
 . Bill Gradison (R)
 . Tony P. Hall (D)
 . Mike Oxley (R)
 . Del Latta (R)
 . Bob McEwen (R)
 . Mike DeWine (R)
 . Tom Kindness (R)
 . Marcy Kaptur (D)
 . Clarence E. Miller (R)
 . Dennis E. Eckart (D)
 . John Kasich (R)
 . Don Pease (D)
 . John F. Seiberling (D)
 . Chalmers Wylie (R)
 . Ralph Regula (R)
 . Lyle Williams (R)
 . Douglas Applegate (D)
 . Ed Feighan (D)
 . Mary Rose Oakar (D)
 . Louis Stokes (D)

Oklahoma 
 . James R. Jones (D)
 . Mike Synar (D)
 . Wes Watkins (D)
 . Dave McCurdy (D)
 . Mickey Edwards (R)
 . Glenn English (D)

Oregon 
 . Les AuCoin (D)
 . Bob Smith (R)
 . Ron Wyden (D)
 . Jim Weaver (D)
 . Denny Smith (R)

Pennsylvania 
 . Thomas M. Foglietta (D)
 . William H. Gray III (D)
 . Robert A. Borski Jr. (D)
 . Joseph P. Kolter (D)
 . Richard T. Schulze (R)
 . Gus Yatron (D)
 . Robert W. Edgar (D)
 . Peter H. Kostmayer (D)
 . Bud Shuster (R)
 . Joseph M. McDade (R)
 . Frank Harrison (D)
 . John Murtha (D)
 . Lawrence Coughlin (R)
 . William J. Coyne (D)
 . Donald L. Ritter (R)
 . Bob Walker (R)
 . George Gekas (R)
 . Doug Walgren (D)
 . Bill Goodling (R)
 . Joseph M. Gaydos (D)
 . Tom Ridge (R)
 . Austin Murphy (D)
 . William Clinger (R)

Rhode Island 
 . Fernand St. Germain (D)
 . Claudine Schneider (R)

South Carolina 
 . Thomas F. Hartnett (R)
 . Floyd Spence (R)
 . Butler Derrick (D)
 . Carroll A. Campbell Jr. (R)
 . John Spratt (D)
 . Robin Tallon (D)

South Dakota 
 . Tom Daschle (D)

Tennessee 
 . Jimmy Quillen (R)
 . John Duncan Sr. (R)
 . Marilyn Lloyd (D)
 . Jim Cooper (D)
 . Bill Boner (D)
 . Al Gore (D)
 . Don Sundquist (R)
 . Ed Jones (D)
 . Harold Ford Sr. (D)

Texas 
 . Sam B. Hall Jr. (D)
 . Charlie Wilson (D)
 . Steve Bartlett (R)
 . Ralph Hall (D)
 . John Bryant (D)
 . Phil Gramm (D), until January 5, 1983
 Phil Gramm (R), from February 12, 1983
 . Bill Archer (R)
 . Jack Fields (R)
 . Jack Brooks (D)
 . J. J. Pickle (D)
 . Marvin Leath (D)
 . Jim Wright (D)
 . Jack Hightower (D)
 . William Neff Patman (D)
 . Kika de la Garza (D)
 . Ron Coleman (D)
 . Charles Stenholm (D)
 . Mickey Leland (D)
 . Kent Hance (D)
 . Henry B. González (D)
 . Tom Loeffler (R)
 . Ron Paul (R)
 . Abraham Kazen (D)
 . Martin Frost (D)
 . Michael A. Andrews (D)
 . Tom Vandergriff (D)
 . Solomon P. Ortiz (D)

Utah 
 . Jim Hansen (R)
 . David Daniel Marriott (R)
 . Howard C. Nielson (R)

Vermont 
 . Jim Jeffords (R)

Virginia 
 . Herbert H. Bateman (R)
 . G. William Whitehurst (R)
 . Thomas J. Bliley Jr. (R)
 . Norman Sisisky (D)
 . Dan Daniel (D)
 . Jim Olin (D)
 . J. Kenneth Robinson (R)
 . Stanford Parris (R)
 . Rick Boucher (D)
 . Frank Wolf (R)

Washington 
 . Joel Pritchard (R)
 . Al Swift (D)
 . Don Bonker (D)
 . Sid Morrison (R)
 . Tom Foley (D)
 . Norm Dicks (D)
 . Mike Lowry (D)
 . Rod Chandler (R)

West Virginia 
 . Alan Mollohan (D)
 . Harley O. Staggers Jr. (D)
 . Bob Wise (D)
 . Nick Rahall (D)

Wisconsin 
 . Les Aspin (D)
 . Robert Kastenmeier (D)
 . Steve Gunderson (R)
 . Clement J. Zablocki (D), until December 3, 1983
 Jerry Kleczka (D), from April 3, 1984
 . Jim Moody (D)
 . Tom Petri (R)
 . Dave Obey (D)
 . Toby Roth (R)
 . Jim Sensenbrenner (R)

Wyoming 
 . Dick Cheney (R)

Non-voting members
 . Fofó Iosefa Fiti Sunia (D)
 . Walter Fauntroy (D)
 . Antonio Borja Won Pat (D)
 . Baltasar Corrada del Río (PNP)
 . Ron de Lugo (D)

Changes in membership

Senate

|-
| Washington(1)
| nowrap  | Henry M. Jackson (D)
| style="font-size:80%" | Died September 1, 1983.  Evans was then appointed to the seat before winning the special election on November 3, 1983.
| nowrap  | Daniel J. Evans (R)
| September 8, 1983
|-
| Massachusetts(2)
| nowrap  | Paul Tsongas (D)
| style="font-size:80%" | Resigned January 2, 1985.  Kerry was elected for next term but was installed early to fill vacancy.
| nowrap  | John Kerry (D)
| January 2, 1985
|}

House of Representatives 

|-
| New York's 7th
|  | Benjamin Stanley Rosenthal (D)
| style="font-size:80%" | Died January 4, 1983
|  | Gary Ackerman (D)
| March 1, 1983
|-
| Texas's 6th
|  | Phil Gramm (D)
| style="font-size:80%" | Resigned January 5, 1983, after being removed from the House Budget Committee for supporting President Ronald Reagan's tax cuts, and then elected to fill his own vacancy
|  | Phil Gramm (R)
| February 12, 1983
|-
| Colorado's 6th
| Vacant. District created in the 1980 census.
| style="font-size:80%" | Republican Jack Swigert was elected in 1982, but died before taking office. Seat filled in special election.
|  | Daniel Schaefer (R)
| March 29, 1983
|-
| California's 5th
|  | Phillip Burton (D)
| style="font-size:80%" | Died April 10, 1983
|  | Sala Burton (D)
| June 21, 1983
|-
| Illinois's 1st
|  | Harold Washington (D)
| style="font-size:80%" | Resigned April 30, 1983, after being installed as Mayor of Chicago
|  | Charles Hayes (D)
| August 23, 1983
|-
| Georgia's 7th
|  | Larry McDonald (D)
| style="font-size:80%" | Died September 1, 1983 onboard the Korean Air Lines Flight 007.
|  | George Darden (D)
| November 8, 1983
|-
| Wisconsin's 4th
|  | Clement J. Zablocki (D)
| style="font-size:80%" | Died December 3, 1983
|  | Jerry Kleczka (D)
| April 3, 1984
|-
| New Jersey's 13th
|  | Edwin B. Forsythe (R)
| style="font-size:80%" | Died March 29, 1984
|  | Jim Saxton (R)
| November 6, 1984
|-
| Florida's 10th
|  | Andy Ireland (D)
| style="font-size:80%" | Changed party affiliation July 5, 1984
|  | Andy Ireland (R)
| July 5, 1984
|-
| Kentucky's 7th
|  | Carl D. Perkins (D)
| style="font-size:80%" | Died August 3, 1984
|  | Chris Perkins (D)
| November 6, 1984
|-
| Illinois's 14th
|  | Tom Corcoran (R)
| style="font-size:80%" | Resigned November 28, 1984
| Vacant
| Not filled this term
|}

Committees

Senate 

 Aging (Special) (Chair: H. John Heinz III)
 Agriculture, Nutrition and Forestry (Chair: Jesse Helms; Ranking Member: Walter D. Huddleston)
 Soil and Water Conservation, Forestry and Environment (Chair: Roger W. Jepsen; Ranking Member: John Melcher)
 Agricultural Credit and Rural Electrification (Chair: Paula Hawkins; Ranking Member: Edward Zorinsky)
 Agricultural Production, Marketing and Stabilization of Prices (Chair: Thad Cochran; Ranking Member: Patrick Leahy)
 Agricultural Research and General Legislation (Chair: Richard G. Lugar; Ranking Member: David L. Boren)
 Rural Development, Oversight and Investigations (Chair: Mark Andrews; Ranking Member: David H. Pryor)
 Foreign Agricultural Policy (Chair: Rudy Boschwitz; Ranking Member: Alan J. Dixon)
 Nutrition (Chair: Bob Dole; Ranking Member: David H. Pryor)
 Appropriations (Chair: Mark Hatfield; Ranking Member: John C. Stennis)
 Agriculture and Related Agencies (Chair: Thad Cochran; Ranking Member: Thomas F. Eagleton)
 Defense (Chair: Ted Stevens; Ranking Member: John C. Stennis)
 District of Columbia (Chair: Arlen Specter; Ranking Member: Patrick J. Leahy)
 Energy and Water Development (Chair: Mark Hatfield; Ranking Member: J. Bennett Johnston)
 Foreign Operations (Chair: Robert W. Kastenmeier; Ranking Member: Daniel K. Inouye)
 HUD-Independent Agencies (Chair: Jake Garn; Ranking Member: Walter D. Huddleston)
 Interior (Chair: James A. McClure; Ranking Member: Robert C. Byrd)
 Labor-Health, Education and Welfare (Chair: Lowell P. Weicker Jr.; Ranking Member: William Proxmire)
 Legislative Branch (Chair: Al D'Amato; Ranking Member: Dale Bumpers)
 Military Construction (Chair: Mack Mattingly; Ranking Member: Jim Sasser)
 Commerce, Justice, State and Judiciary (Chair: Paul Laxalt; Ranking Member: Ernest F. Hollings)
 Transportation (Chair: Mark Andrews; Ranking Member: Lawton Chiles)
 Treasury, Postal Service and General Government (Chair: James Abdnor; Ranking Member: Dennis DeConcini)
 Armed Services (Chair: John Tower; Ranking Member: Henry M. Jackson)
 Military Construction (Chair: Strom Thurmond; Ranking Member: Gary Hart) 
 Tactical Warfare (Chair: Barry Goldwater; Ranking Member: Ted Kennedy)
 Strategic and Theater Nuclear Forces (Chair: John W. Warner; Ranking Member: Henry M. Jackson)
 Preparedness (Chair: Gordon J. Humphrey); Ranking Member: Carl Levin)
 Sea Power and Force Projection (Chair: William S. Cohen; Ranking Member: Sam Nunn)
 Manpower and Personnel (Chair: Roger W. Jepsen; Ranking Member: J. James Exon)
 Banking, Housing and Urban Affairs (Chair: Jake Garn; Ranking Member: William Proxmire)
 Housing and Urban Affairs (Chair: John Tower; Ranking Member: Donald W. Riegle Jr.)
 Financial Institutions (Chair: William L. Armstrong; Ranking Member: Alan Cranston)
 International Finance and Monetary Policy (Chair: H. John Heinz III; Ranking Member: William Proxmire)
 Securities (Chair: Al D'Amato; Ranking Member: Paul Sarbanes)
 Economic Policy (Chair: Slade Gorton; Ranking Member: Chris Dodd)
 Consumer Affairs (Chair: Paula Hawkins; Ranking Member: Chris Dodd)
 Rural Housing and Development (Chair: Mack Mattingly; Ranking Member: Alan Cranston)
 Insurance (Chair: Chic Hecht; Ranking Member: Paul Sarbanes)
 Federal Credit Programs (Chair: Paul S. Trible Jr.; Ranking Member: Jim Sasser)
 Budget (Chair: Pete Domenici; Ranking Member: Lawton Chiles)
 Commerce, Science and Transportation (Chair: Bob Packwood; Ranking Member: Ernest F. Hollings)
 Aviation (Chair: Nancy Landon Kassebaum; Ranking Member: J. James Exon)
 Business, Trade and Tourism (Chair: Larry Pressler; Ranking Member: Donald W. Riegle Jr.)
 Communications (Chair: Barry Goldwater; Ranking Member: Ernest F. Hollings)
 Consumer (Chair: Bob Kasten; Ranking Member: Wendell H. Ford)
 Merchant Marine (Chair: Ted Stevens; Ranking Member: Daniel K. Inouye)
 Science, Technology and Space (Chair: Slade Gorton; Ranking Member: Howell Heflin)
 Surface Transportation (Chair: John C. Danforth; Ranking Member: Russell B. Long)
 National Ocean Policy Study (Chair: Bob Packwood; Ranking Member: Ernest F. Hollings)
 Energy and Natural Resources (Chair: James A. McClure; Ranking Member: J. Bennett Johnston)
 Energy Conservation and Supply (Chair: Lowell P. Weicker; Ranking Member: Spark Matsunaga)
 Energy and Mineral Resources (Chair: John Warner; Ranking Member: John Melcher)
 Energy Regulation (Chair: Frank H. Murkowski; Ranking Member: Howard M. Metzenbaum)
 Energy Research and Development (Chair: Pete Domenici; Ranking Member: Wendell H. Ford)
 Public Lands and Reserved Water (Chair: Malcolm Wallop; Ranking Member: Dale Bumpers)
 Water and Power (Chair: Don Nickles; Ranking Member: Paul Tsongas)
 Environment and Public Works (Chair: Robert Stafford; Ranking Member: Jennings Randolph)
 Environmental Pollution (Chair: John H. Chafee; Ranking Member: George J. Mitchell)
 Nuclear Regulation (Chair: Alan K. Simpson; Ranking Member: George J. Mitchell; Ranking Member: Gary W. Hart)
 Water Resources (Chair: James Abdnor; Ranking Member: Daniel Moynihan)
 Transportation (Chair: Steve Symms; Ranking Member: Lloyd Bentsen)
 Toxic Substances and Environmental Oversight (Chair: David Durenberger; Ranking Member: Max Baucus)
 Regional and Community Development (Chair: Gordon J. Humphrey; Ranking Member: Quentin Burdick)
 Ethics (Select) (Chair: Ted Stevens; Vice Chair: Howell Heflin)
 Finance (Chair: Bob Dole; Ranking Member: Russell B. Long)
 Taxation and Debt Management (Chair: Bob Packwood; Ranking Member: Spark Matsunaga)
 International Trade (Chair: John C. Danforth; Ranking Member: Lloyd Bentsen)
 Savings, Pensions and Investment Policy (Chair: John H. Chafee; Ranking Member: David H. Pryor)
 Economic Growth, Employment and Revenue (Chair: H. John Heinz III; Ranking Member: George J. Mitchell)
 Energy and Agricultural Taxation (Chair: Malcolm Wallop; Ranking Member: Bill Bradley) 
 Health (Chair: David Durenberger; Ranking Member: Max Baucus)
 Social Security and Income Maintenance Programs (Chair: William L. Armstrong; Ranking Member: Daniel Moynihan)
 Estate and Gift Taxation (Chair: Steve Symms; Ranking Member: David L. Boren)
 Oversight of the Internal Revenue Service (Chair: Chuck Grassley; Ranking Member: Russell B. Long)
 Foreign Relations (Chair: Charles H. Percy; Ranking Member: Claiborne Pell)
 International Economic Policy (Chair: Charles Mathias; Ranking Member: Chris Dodd)
 African Affairs (Chair: Nancy Kassebaum; Ranking Member: Paul Tsongas)
 East Asian and Pacific Affairs (Chair: Frank Murkowski; Ranking Member: John Glenn)
 Western Hemisphere Affairs (Chair: Jesse Helms; Ranking Member: Edward Zorinsky)
 Arms Control, Oceans, International Operations and Environment (Chair: Larry Pressler; Ranking Member: Alan Cranston)
 Near Eastern and South Asian Affairs (Chair: Rudy Boschwitz; Ranking Member: Paul Sarbanes)
 European Affairs (Chair: Richard G. Lugar; Ranking Member: Joe Biden)
 Governmental Affairs (Chair: William V. Roth; Ranking Member: Thomas F. Eagleton)
 Permanent Subcommittee on Investigations (Chair: Charles Mathias; Ranking Member: Sam Nunn)
 Governmental Efficiency and the District of Columbia (Chair: Charles Mathias; Ranking Member: Thomas F. Eagleton)
 Energy, Nuclear Proliferation and Federal Services (Chair: Charles H. Percy; Ranking Member: John Glenn)
 Information Management and Regulatory Affairs (Chair: John C. Danforth; Ranking Member: Lawton Chiles)
 Intergovernmental Relations (Chair: David Durenberger; Ranking Member: Jim Sasser)
 Civil Service, Post Office and General Services (Chair: Ted Stevens; Ranking Member: Jeff Bingaman)
 Oversight of Government Management (Chair: William S. Cohen; Ranking Member: Carl Levin)
 Indian Affairs (Select) (Chair: Mark Andrews)
 Judiciary (Chair: Strom Thurmond; Ranking Member: Joe Biden) 
 Patents, Copyrights and Trademarks (Chair: Paul Laxalt; Ranking Member: Howard Metzenbaum)
 Criminal Law (Chair: Paul Laxalt; Ranking Member: Joe Biden)
 Constitution (Chair: Orrin Hatch; Ranking Member: Dennis DeConcini)
 Courts (Chair: Bob Dole; Ranking Member: Howell Heflin)
 Immigration and Refugee Policy (Chair: Alan K. Simpson; Ranking Member: Ted Kennedy)
 Separation of Powers (Chair: John P. East; Ranking Member: Max Baucus)
 Administration Practice and Procedure (Chair: Chuck Grassley; Ranking Member: Howell Heflin)
 Security and Terrorism (Chair: Jeremiah Denton; Ranking Member: Howard M. Metzenbaum)
 Juvenile Justice (Chair: Arlen Specter; Ranking Member: Howard M. Metzenbaum)
 Intelligence (Select) (Chair: Barry Goldwater; Ranking Member: Daniel Moynihan)
 Labor and Human Resources (Chair: Orrin Hatch; Ranking Member: Ted Kennedy)
 Labor (Chair: Don Nickles; Ranking Member: Donald W. Riegle Jr.)
 Education, Arts and Humanities (Chair: Robert T. Stafford; Ranking Member: Claiborne Pell)
 Employment and Productivity (Chair: Dan Quayle; Ranking Member: Howard M. Metzenbaum)
 Handicapped (Chair: Lowell P. Weicker; Ranking Member: Jennings Randolph)
 Alcoholism and Drug Abuse (Chair: Gordon J. Humphrey; Ranking Member: Spark M. Matsunaga)
 Aging (Chair: Chuck Grassley; Ranking Member: Thomas F. Eagleton)
 Family and Human Services (Chair: Jeremiah Denton; Ranking Member: Chris Dodd)
 Nutrition and Human Needs (Select)
 Rules and Administration (Chair: Charles Mathias; Ranking Member: Wendell Ford) 
 Senate Committee System (Special)
 Small Business (Chair: Lowell P. Weicker Jr.; Ranking Member: Sam Nunn)
 Capital Formation and Detention (Chair: Bob Packwood; Ranking Member: Dale Bumpers)
 Government Regulation and Paperwork (Chair: Orrin Hatch; Ranking Member: Walter D. Huddleston)
 Urban and Rural Economic Development (Chair: Al D'Amato; Ranking Member: Alan J. Dixon)
 Government Procurement (Chair: Don Nickles; Ranking Member: Carl Levin)
 Productivity and Competition (Chair: Slade Gorton; Ranking Member: Paul Tsongas)
 Innovation and Technology (Chair: Warren Rudman; Ranking Member: Max Baucus)
 Export Promotion and Market Development (Chair: Rudy Boschwitz; Ranking Member: Walter D. Huddleston)
 Small Business Family Farm (Chair: Larry Pressler; Ranking Member: Sam Nunn)
 Entrepreneurship and Special Problems Facing Small Business (Chair: Bob Kasten; Ranking Member: David L. Boren)
 Veterans' Affairs (Chair: Alan K. Simpson; Ranking Member: Alan Cranston)
 Whole

House of Representatives 

 Aging (Select) (Chair: Edward R. Roybal)
 Agriculture (Chair: Kika de la Garza; Ranking Member: Edward Madigan)
 Cotton, Rice and Sugar (Chair: Jerry Huckaby; Ranking Member: Arlan Stangeland)
 Livestock, Dairy and Poultry (Chair: Tom Harkin; Ranking Member: Jim Jeffords)
 Tobacco and Peanuts (Chair: Charlie Rose; Ranking Member: Larry J. Hopkins)
 Wheat, Soybeans and Feed Grains (Chair: Tom Foley; Ranking Member: Ron Marlenee)
 Conservation Credit and Rural Development (Chair: Ed Jones; Ranking Member: E. Thomas Coleman)
 Department Operations Research and Foreign Agriculture (Chair: George E. Brown Jr.; Ranking Member: Pat Roberts)
 Domestic Marketing, Consumer Relations and Nutrition (Chair: Leon E. Panetta; Ranking Member: Bill Emerson)
 Forests, Family Farms and Energy (Chair: Charles Whitley; Ranking Member: George V. Hansen)
 Appropriations (Chair: Jamie L. Whitten; Ranking Member: Silvio O. Conte)
 Agriculture, Rural Development and Related Agencies (Chair: Jamie L. Whitten; Ranking Member: Virginia Smith)
 Commerce, Justice, State and the Judiciary (Chair: Neal Edward Smith; Ranking Member: George M. O'Brien)
 Defense (Chair: Joseph P. Addabbo; Ranking Member: Jack Edwards)
 District of Columbia (Chair: Julian C. Dixon; Ranking Member: Lawrence Coughlin)
 Energy and Water Development (Chair: Tom Bevill; Ranking Member: John T. Myers)
 Foreign Operations (Chair: Clarence D. Long; Ranking Member: Jack F. Kemp)
 HUD-Independent Agencies (Chair: Edward Boland; Ranking Member: Bill Green)
 Interior (Chair: Sidney R. Yates; Ranking Member: Joe Biden; Ranking Member: Joseph M. McDade)
 Labor-Health and Human Services (Chair: William Huston Natcher; Ranking Member: Silvio O. Conte)
 Legislative (Chair: Vic Fazio; Ranking Member: Jerry Lewis)
 Military Construction (Chair: Bill Hefner; Ranking Member: Ralph Regula)
 Transportation (Chair: William Lehman; Ranking Member: Lawrence Coughlin)
 Treasury, Postal Service and General Government (Chair: Edward Roybal; Ranking Member: Clarence E. Miller)
 Armed Services (Chair: Charles Melvin Price; Ranking Member: William L. Dickinson)
 Research and Development (Chair: Charles Melvin Price; Ranking Member: William L. Dickinson)
 Seapower, Strategic and Critical Materials (Chair: Charles Edward Bennett; Ranking Member: Floyd Spence)
 Procurement and Military Nuclear Systems (Chair: Samuel S. Stratton; Ranking Member: Marjorie S. Holt)
 Investigations (Chair: Bill Nichols; Ranking Member: Larry J. Hopkins)
 Readiness (Chair: Dan Daniel; Ranking Member: G. William Whitehurst)
 Military Personnel and Compensation (Chair: Les Aspin; Ranking Member: Elwood Hillis)
 Military Installations and Facilities (Chair: Ron Dellums; Ranking Member: Ken Kramer)
 Banking, Finance and Urban Affairs (Chair: Fernand St. Germain; Ranking Member: Chalmers P. Wylie)
 Financial Institutions Supervision, Regulation and Insurance (Chair: Fernand St. Germain; Ranking Member: Chalmers P. Wylie)
 Housing and Community Development (Chair: Henry B. Gonzalez; Ranking Member: Stewart B. McKinney)
 General Oversight and Renegotiation (Chair: Joseph G. Minish; Ranking Member: Stanford Parris)
 Consumer Affairs and Coinage (Chair: Frank Annunzio; Ranking Member: Ron Paul)
 International Development Institutions and Finance (Chair: Jerry M. Patterson; Ranking Member: Doug Bereuter)
 Domestic Monetary Policy (Chair: Walter E. Fauntroy; Ranking Member: George V. Hansen)
 International Trade, Investment and Monetary Policy (Chair: Stephen L. Neal; Ranking Member: Jim Leach)
 Economic Stabilization (Chair: John J. LaFalce; Ranking Member: Norman D. Shumway)
 Budget (Chair: James R. Jones; Ranking Member: Del Latta)
 Capital Resources and Development (Chair: Tim Wirth; Ranking Member: Bobbi Fiedler)
 Energy and Technology (Chair: Leon Panetta; Ranking Member: Tom Loeffler)
 Budget Process (Chair: Leon Panetta; Ranking Member: Bud Shuster)
 Education and Employment (Chair: Dick Gephardt; Ranking Member: Lynn Morley Martin)
 Federalism/State-Local Relations (Chair: Bill Nelson; Ranking Member: Bill Frenzel)
 Economic Policy and Growth (Chair: Les Aspin; Ranking Member: Ed Bethune)
 Tax Policy (Chair: Thomas J. Downey; Ranking Member: Jack F. Kemp)
 Entitlements, Uncontrollables and Indexing (Chair: Brian J. Donnelly; Ranking Member: Phil Gramm)
 International Finance and Trade (Chair: Mike Lowry; Ranking Member: Bill Frenzel)
 Children, Youth and Families (Select) (Chair: George Miller)
 District of Columbia (Chair: Ron Dellums; Ranking Member: Stewart B. McKinney)
 Fiscal Affairs and Health (Chair: Walter E. Fauntroy; Ranking Member: Marjorie S. Holt)
 Government Operations and Metropolitan Affairs (Chair: William H. Gray III; Ranking Member: Stanford Parris)
 Judiciary and Education (Chair: Mervyn M. Dymally; Ranking Member: Thomas J. Bliley Jr.)
 Education and Labor (Chair: Carl D. Perkins, then Augustus F. Hawkins; Ranking Member: John N. Erlenborn)
 Elementary, Secondary and Vocational Education (Chair: Carl D. Perkins; Ranking Member: Bill Goodling)
 Employment Opportunities (Chair: Augustus F. Hawkins; Ranking Member: Jim Jeffords)
 Labor-Management Relations (Chair: Phillip Burton; Ranking Member: Marge Roukema)
 Health and Safety (Chair: Joseph M. Gaydos; Ranking Member: Steve Gunderson)
 Human Resources (Chair: Ike Andrews; Ranking Member: Tom Petri)
 Postsecondary Education (Chair: Paul Simon; Ranking Member: E. Thomas Coleman)
 Labor Standards (Chair: George Miller; Ranking Member: John N. Erlenborn)
 Select Education (Chair: Austin J. Murphy; Ranking Member: Steve Bartlett)
 Energy and Commerce (Chair: John Dingell; Ranking Member: Jim Broyhill)
 Oversight and Investigations (Chair: John Dingell; Ranking Member: Jim Broyhill)
 Energy Conservation and Power (Chair: Richard L. Ottinger; Ranking Member: Carlos J. Moorhead)
 Health and the Environment (Chair: Henry Waxman; Ranking Member: Edward Madigan)
 Telecommunications, Consumer Protection and Finance (Chair: Tim Wirth; Ranking Member: Matthew J. Rinaldo)
 Fossil and Synthetic Fuels (Chair: Philip Sharp; Ranking Member: Tom Corcoran)
 Commerce, Transportation and Tourism (Chair: James J. Florio; Ranking Member: Norman F. Lent)
 Foreign Affairs (Chair: Clement J. Zablocki, then Dante Fascell; Ranking Member: William S. Broomfield)
 International Security and Scientific Affairs (Chair: Clement J. Zablocki; Ranking Member: William S. Broomfield)
 International Operations (Chair: Dante Fascell; Ranking Member: Benjamin A. Gilman)
 Europe and the Middle East (Chair: Lee H. Hamilton; Ranking Member: Larry Winn Jr.)
 Human Rights and International Organizations (Chair: Gus Yatron; Ranking Member: Jim Leach)
 Asian and Pacific Affairs (Chair: Stephen J. Solarz; Ranking Member: Joel Pritchard)
 International Economic Policy and Trade (Chair: Don Bonker; Ranking Member: Toby Roth)
 Western Hemisphere Affairs (Chair: Michael D. Barnes; Ranking Member: Robert J. Lagomarsino)
 Africa (Chair: Howard Wolpe; Ranking Member: Gerald B.H. Solomon)
 Government Operations (Chair: Jack Brooks; Ranking Member: Frank Horton)
 Legislation and National Security (Chair: Jack Brooks; Ranking Member: Frank Horton)
 Government Activities and Transportation (Chair: Cardiss Collins; Ranking Member: Raymond J. McGrath)
 Government Information and Individual Rights (Chair: Glenn English; Ranking Member: Thomas N. Kindness)
 Ingovernmental Relations and Human Resources (Chair: Ted Weiss; Ranking Member: Robert S. Walker)
 Environment, Energy and Natural Resources (Chair: Mike Synar; Ranking Member: Lyle Williams)
 Commerce, Consumer and Monetary Affairs (Chair: Doug Barnard Jr.; Ranking Member: Judd Gregg)
 Manpower and Housing (Chair: Barney Frank; Ranking Member: John R. McKernan Jr.)
 House Administration (Chair: Augustus F. Hawkins, then Frank Annunzio; Ranking Member: Bill Frenzel)
 Accounts (Chair: Frank Annunzio; Ranking Member: Robert E. Badham)
 Contracts and Printing (Chair: Joseph M. Gaydos; Ranking Member: Newt Gingrich)
 Services (Chair: Ed Jones; Ranking Member: William L. Dickinson)
 Office Systems (Chair: Charlie Rose; Ranking Member: Bill Thomas)
 Personnel and Police (Chair: Joseph G. Minish; Ranking Member: Rod Chandler)
 Interior and Insular Affairs (Chair: Mo Udall; Ranking Member: Manuel Lujan Jr.)
 Energy and the Environment (Chair: Mo Udall; Ranking Member: Manuel Lujan Jr.)
 Water and Power Resources (Chair: Abraham Kazen Jr.; Ranking Member: Dick Cheney)
 Public Lands and National Lands (Chair: John F. Seiberling; Ranking Member: Don Young)
 Insular Affairs (Chair: Antonio Borja Won Pat; Ranking Member: Robert J. Lagomarsino)
 Mining, Forest Management and Bonneville Power Administration (Chair: Jim Weaver; Ranking Member: Dan Marriott)
 Oversight and Investigations (Chair: Ed Markey; Ranking Member: Ron Marlenee)
 Judiciary (Chair: Peter W. Rodino; Ranking Member: Hamilton Fish IV)
 Immigration (Chair: Romano L. Mazzoli; Ranking Member: Dan Lungren)
 Courts (Chair: Robert W. Kastenmeier; Ranking Member: Carlos J. Moorhead)
 Monopolies (Chair: Peter W. Rodino; Ranking Member: Hamilton Fish IV)
 Administrative Law (Chair: Sam B. Hall Jr.; Ranking Member: Thomas N. Kindness)
 Civil and Constitutional Rights (Chair: Don Edwards; Ranking Member: James Sensenbrenner)
 Crime (Chair: William J. Hughes; Ranking Member: Harold Sawyer)
 Criminal Justice (Chair: John Conyers Jr.; Ranking Member: George W. Gekas)
 Merchant Marine and Fisheries (Chair: Walter B. Jones Sr.; Ranking Member: Edwin B. Forsythe)
 Merchant Marine (Chair: Mario Biaggi; Ranking Member: Gene Snyder)
 Fisheries, Wildlife Conservation and the Environment (Chair: John B. Breaux; Ranking Member: Edwin B. Forsythe)
 Coast Guard and Navigation (Chair: Gerry Studds; Ranking Member: Don Young)
 Panama Canal and Outer Continental Stuff (Chair: Carroll Hubbard Jr.; Ranking Member: William Carney)
 Oceangraphy (Chair: Norman D'Amours; Ranking Member: Joel Pritchard)
 Narcotics Abuse and Control (Select) (Chair: Charles Rangel)
 Post Office and Civil Service (Chair: Jack Brooks; Ranking Member: Gene Taylor)
 Investigations (Chair: William D. Ford; Ranking Member: Gene Taylor)
 Postal Operations and Services (Chair: Bill Clay; Ranking Member: Tom Corcoran)
 Civil Service (Chair: Patricia Schroeder; Ranking Member: Chip Pashayan)
 Census and Population (Chair: Robert Garcia; Ranking Member: Jim Courter)
 Postal Personnel and Modernization (Chair: Mickey Leland; Ranking Member: Frank R. Wolf)
 Compensation and Employee Benefits (Chair: Mary Rose Oakar; Ranking Member: William Dannemeyer)
 Human Resources (Chair: Donald J. Albosta; Ranking Member: Dan Crane)
 Public Works and Transportation (Chair: James J. Howard; Ranking Member: Gene Snyder)
 Aviation (Chair: Norman Y. Mineta; Ranking Member: John Paul Hammerschmidt)
 Economic Development (Chair: James L. Oberstar; Ranking Member: William F. Clinger Jr.)
 Investigations and Oversight (Chair: Elliott H. Levitas; Ranking Member: Guy Molinari)
 Public Buildings and Grounds (Chair: Robert A. Young; Ranking Member: E. Clay Shaw Jr.)
 Surface Transportation (Chair: Glenn M. Anderson; Ranking Member: Bud Shuster)
 Water Resources (Chair: Robert A. Roe; Ranking Member: Arlan Stangeland)
 Rules (Chair: Claude Pepper; Ranking Member: Jimmy Quillen)
 The Legislative Process (Chair: Gillis W. Long; Ranking Member: Trent Lott)
 Rules of the House (Chair: Joe Moakley; Ranking Member: Gene Taylor)
 Science and Technology (Chair: Don Fuqua; Ranking Member: Larry Winn Jr.)
 Energy Development and Applications (Chair: Don Fuqua; Ranking Member: James Sensenbrenner)
 Natural Resources, Agriculture Research and Environment (Chair: James H. Scheuer; Ranking Member: Robert S. Walker)
 Energy Research and Production (Chair: Marilyn Lloyd; Ranking Member: Robert S. Walker)
 Science, Research and Technology (Chair: Doug Walgren; Ranking Member: Judd Gregg)
 Transportation, Aviation and Materials (Chair: Dan Glickman; Ranking Member: William Carney)
 Investigations and Oversight (Chair: Al Gore; Ranking Member: Joe Skeen)
 Space Science and Applications (Chair: Harold Volkmer; Ranking Member: Manuel Lujan Jr.)
 Small Business (Chair: Parren Mitchell; Ranking Member: Joseph M. McDade)
 SBA and SBIC Authority, Minority Enterprise and General Small Business Problems (Chair: Parren Mitchell; Ranking Member: Joseph M. McDade)
 General Oversight and the Economy (Chair: Berkley Bedell; Ranking Member: Silvio O. Conte)
 Antitrust and Restraint of Trade Activities affecting Small Business (Chair: Tom Luken; Ranking Member: Vin Weber)
 Energy, Environment and Safety Issues affecting Small Business (Chair: Ike Skelton; Ranking Member: John P. Hiler)
 Tax, Access to Equity Capital and Business Opportunities (Chair: Henry Nowak; Ranking Member: Lyle Williams)
 Export Opportunities and Special Small Business Problems (Chair: Andy Ireland; Ranking Member: William S. Broomfield)
 Standards of Official Conduct (Chair: Louis Stokes; Ranking Member: Floyd D. Spence)
 Veterans' Affairs (Chair: Gillespie V. Montgomery; Ranking Member: John Paul Hammerschmidt)
 Oversight and Investigations (Chair: Gillespie V. Montgomery; Ranking Member: Elwood Hillis)
 Hospitals and Health Care (Chair: Bob Edgar; Ranking Member: John Paul Hammerschmidt)
 Education, Training and Employment (Chair: Marvin Leath; Ranking Member: Gerald B.H. Solomon)
 Compensation, Pension and Insurance (Chair: Douglas Applegate; Ranking Member: Bob McEwen)
 Housing and Memorial Affairs (Chair: Richard Shelby; Ranking Member: Chris Smith)
 Ways and Means (Chair: Dan Rostenkowski; Ranking Member: Barber Conable Jr.)
 Trade (Chair: Sam Gibbons; Ranking Member: Guy Vander Jagt)
 Social Security (Chair: J.J. Pickle; Ranking Member: Bill Archer)
 Oversight (Chair: Charles Rangel; Ranking Member: James G. Martin)
 Select Revenue Measures (Chair: Pete Stark; Ranking Member: John J. Duncan)
 Health (Chair: Andrew Jacobs Jr.; Ranking Member: W. Henson Moore)
 Public Assistance and Unemployment Compensation (Chair: Harold Ford Jr.; Ranking Member: Carroll Campbell Jr.)
 Whole

Joint committees

 Economic (Chair: Sen. Roger W. Jepsen; Vice Chair: Rep. Lee H. Hamilton)
 Taxation (Chair: Rep. Dan Rostenkowski; Vice Chair: Sen. Bob Dole)
 The Library (Chair: Sen. Charles Mathias; Vice Chair: Rep. Augustus F. Hawkins)
 Printing (Chair: Rep. Augustus F. Hawkins; Vice Chair: Sen. Charles Mathias)

Employees

Legislative branch agency directors 
 Architect of the Capitol: George M. White
 Attending Physician of the United States Congress: Freeman H. Cary
 Comptroller General of the United States: Charles A. Bowsher
 Director of the Congressional Budget Office: Alice M. Rivlin, until August 31, 1983 
 Rudolph G. Penner, from September 1, 1983
 Librarian of Congress: Daniel J. Boorstin 
 Public Printer of the United States: Danford L. Sawyer Jr., until 1984
 Ralph E. Kennickell Jr., from 1984

Senate 
 Chaplain: Richard C. Halverson (Presbyterian)
 Curator: James R. Ketchum
 Historian: Richard A. Baker
 Parliamentarian: Bob Dove
 Secretary: William Hildenbrand
 Librarian: Roger K. Haley
 Secretary for the Majority: Howard O. Greene Jr.
 Secretary for the Minority: Patrick J. Griffin
 Sergeant at Arms: Howard S. Liebengood, until September 13, 1983 
 Larry E. Smith, from September 13, 1983

House of Representatives 
 Chaplain: James David Ford (Lutheran)
 Clerk: Benjamin J. Guthrie
 Doorkeeper: James T. Molloy
 Historian: Ray Smock, from 1983
 Parliamentarian: William H. Brown
 Reading Clerks: Meg Goetz (D) and Bob Berry (R)
 Postmaster: Robert V. Rota
 Sergeant at Arms: Jack Russ

See also
 List of new members of the 98th United States Congress
 1982 United States elections (elections leading to this Congress)
 1982 United States Senate elections
 1982 United States House of Representatives elections
 1984 United States elections (elections during this Congress, leading to the next Congress)
 1984 United States presidential election
 1984 United States Senate elections
 1984 United States House of Representatives elections

Notes

References

External links
 Biographical Directory of the U.S. Congress
 U.S. House of Representatives: Congressional History
 U.S. Senate: Statistics and Lists